Tony Sukkar (born 1963) is a Lebanese alpine skier. He competed in two events at the 1984 Winter Olympics.

References

1963 births
Living people
Lebanese male alpine skiers
Olympic alpine skiers of Lebanon
Alpine skiers at the 1984 Winter Olympics
Place of birth missing (living people)